Inland Revenue Department may refer to the following government departments responsible for taxation:

Inland Revenue Department (Hong Kong)
Inland Revenue Department (Nepal)
Inland Revenue Department (New Zealand)
Inland Revenue Department (Sri Lanka), housed in Clan House, Galle